Anardar-e Bala (also Romanized as Anārdar-e Bālā) is a village in Koregah-e Gharbi Rural District, in the Central District of Khorramabad County, Lorestan Province, Iran. At the 2006 census, its population was 49, in 10 families.

References 

Towns and villages in Khorramabad County